The 2021 Dakar Rally was a rally raid event held in Saudi Arabia and the 43rd edition of the Dakar Rally. The event was held for 14 days, starting from 3 January and ended 15 January 2021. It was the second time Saudi Arabia had hosted the event, with support from the Saudi Automobile and Motorcycle Federation. The race started and ended in Jeddah, allowing the competitors to venture through the desert and alongside the Red Sea. The route consists of one prologue stage and 12 normal stages, with one rest day in Ha'il on 9 January. The rally was originally intended to run through 2–3 additional countries, with Egypt and Jordan being rumoured likely candidates. However, due to travel and border restrictions implemented in response to the COVID-19 pandemic, the route stayed entirely within Saudi Arabian territory.

Summary

The route 
A completely new route has been put together, described as a lot slower, more varied, and more technical. The route includes 1 Prologue stage, 12 stages including 2 loop stages, 1 marathon stage. The exact route was revealed in November 2020.

Changes 
There will be a Prologue stage that will determine the starting positions for Stage 1. The Road Books will only be distributed 10 min. prior to the start of the stage. There will be an option of a digital roadbook. New classifications will be introduced for T3: Light Proto, T4: SSV, T5: Truck. The Elite / Priority Driver list will be extended from bike only to all categories. Original by MOTUL category will continue, which limits and controls on the use of external assistance. Improvements in safety include a speed limit of 90 km/h in hazardous sectors, mandatory first aid training certificate for all competitors, automatic Sentinel sound warning system for dangers classed level 2 and 3, and mandatory airbag vests for all bike and quad drivers. New regulations for Elite bikers will see a limit of 1 piston change and 6 rear tires for the whole rally; all tires will need to be the same brand and model. Bikers will not be allowed assistance during the refueling. The organizers are promoting vehicles using alternative energy sources by introducing a 50% registration fee discount in all categories, introducing a prize in the Alternative Energy Challenge, and introducing new regulations for these vehicles. Dakar Experience ranking and regulations have been revamped, it will only be available for amateur, non-Elite/Priority drivers. A new Dakar Classic class will be introduced for cars and trucks manufactured before 2000, or new cars built to original pre-2000 specification. These vehicles will share the same bivouac and the organization but will run in a parallel, yet different route, suitable for historic vehicles. The class will feature a reduced entry fee, yet the same rules and fees will apply for the assistance.

Further changes came just before the event, when revamped FIA regulations for Cross-Country rally stipulated speed limits across all categories. Motorcycles and Quads had already been subjected to speed limits for several years.

This year is the first time cars are allowed to run turbocharged petrol engines, previously only diesels could be turbocharged. The first makers to avail of this regulation were Prodrive with its new BRX Hunter car.

Entry list

Number of entries

Vehicles and Categories

Separate rankings for women and newcomers in each category, "Original by Motul" for bikes, as well as 6x6, <10 L engine size, alternative energies rankings for trucks.

  – The "Dakar Legends" - competitors that participated in 10 or more Dakar events.  – The first time starters - "rookies".  – Competitors that were not able to start the race. – Competitors participating in "Original by Motul" — limited assistance marathon class.

  – The "Dakar Legends" - competitors that participated in 10 or more Dakar events.  – The first time starters - "rookies".  – Competitors that were not able to start the race. – Competitors participating in "Original by Motul" — limited assistance marathon class.

  – The "Dakar Legends" - competitors that participated in 10 or more Dakar events.  – The first time starters - "rookies".  – Competitors that were not able to start the race.

  – The "Dakar Legends" - competitors that participated in 10 or more Dakar events.  – The first time starters - "rookies".  – Late entries.  – Competitors that were not able to start the race.

  – The "Dakar Legends" - competitors that participated in 10 or more Dakar events.  – The first time starters - "rookies".  – Late entries.  – Competitors that were not able to start the race.

  – The "Dakar Legends" - competitors that participated in 10 or more Dakar events.  – The first time starters - "rookies".  – Competitors that were not able to start the race.

A number of participants were affected by the on-going COVID-19 pandemic. Before participants travelled to Saudi Arabia on 26-27 of December, Nani Roma co-driver Daniel Oliveras Carreras had to be replaced by Alexandre Winocq, Gintas Petrus co-driver Povilas Valaitis replaced by José Marques, Denis Krotov co-driver Konstantin Zhiltsov replaced by Oleg Uparenko, Ricardo Porem co-driver Manuel Porem replaced by Jorge Monteiro. Vaidotas Žala two main technicians contracted the coronavirus, numerous other teams were forced to make last-minute changes to replace team members that were tested positive for coronavirus. Trucks #523 and #526 withdrew after Francesc Ester and Jorge Ballbe contracted coronavirus.
After arrival in Jeddah, all participants had to take two coronavirus tests two days apart. #56 Giordano Pacheco and #357 Alexey Titov tests came back positive, repeat tests were also positive, and they were forced to withdraw from the race. #23 Ivan Jakeš second test came back positive. They all had to self-isolate for 7 days before being allowed to travel home.

Stages 

Stage 5 proved to be very difficult for significant number of competitors who finished it very late. Therefore, organizers decided to delay the start of stage 6 by 1 hour 30 minutes and shorten the special on stage 6 by 100 kilometres.

Stage 11 has been shortened by 50 km due to weather conditions.

Stage winners

Stage results

Bikes

Quads

Cars

Light Prototypes

UTVs

Trucks

Classics

Final standings

Bikes

Quads

Cars

Light Prototypes

UTVs

Trucks

Classics

Original by Motul
The “Original by Motul” category, refers to bikes and quads competitors competing without any kind of assistance. The organizers provide 1 trunk per competitor for storage of the personal belongings, spare parts and tools. Competitors are only allowed to bring 1 headlight, 1 set of wheels, 1 set of tyres, 1 tent with sleeping bag and mattress, 1 travel bag and 1x 25L backpack. Organizers allow free use of the generators, compressors and tool-boxes in the bivouac. 31 competitors started the race in this category, and 20 reached the finish.

Incidents 
CS Santosh, riding Hero 450 Rally, suffered high speed crash on Stage 4, sustaining head injuries. Fellow riders performed CPR until the medics arrived. Santosh was placed in an induced coma awaiting further tests. Scans revealed no major injuries apart from dislocated shoulder, and no major issues that would impact recovery, was announced on 11 January 2021.

Toyota Gazoo Racing Hilux driver Henk Lategan crashed heavily on Stage 5, and was airlifted to hospital with a broken collar bone. His co-driver, Brett Cummings, walked away uninjured.

Two incidents took place on Stage 7. French rider Pierre Cherpin, riding Husqvarna bike, crashed heavily at kilometer 178, sustaining head injuries. He was airlifted to hospital and placed in an induced coma. Another Frenchman Olivier Susset collided with a Sodicars buggy at kilometer 419, driven by Manuel Plaza Perez and Mónica Plaza, and was hospitalized with suspected broken ankle and elbow. On 14 January 2021 Pierre Cherpin died while being transferred from Saudi Arabia to France.

Two more incidents occurred on Stage 8. Husqvarna biker  crashed heavily and was hospitalized. Another Husqvarna rider, Maurizio Gerini, was taken to hospital after finishing the stage. Gerini suffered heavy fall 30 km to the finish, but managed to complete the stage. He was diagnosed with internal bleeding in abdomen area.

Three more bikers crashed out and were airlifted to the hospital on Stage 9. KTM rider Toby Price crashed on kilometre 155 and suffered broken collar bone and both wrists as well as extensive bruising. 
Luciano Benavides riding Honda was also airlifted after falling and dislocating his shoulder on kilometre 242. 
Husqvarna rider Maciej Giemza withdrew after he tore his shoulder ligaments and suffered two fractures in the foot after hitting a rock at 110 km/h and rolling several times.

On Stage 10, José Ignacio Cornejo, who entered the stage with an 11-minute lead in the overall standings in the bike category, crashed 252 kilometers into the stage. Cornejo continued to the finish of the stage, but was forced to retire by race organizers after a medical evaluation at the finishing area revealed a concussion. He was airlifted to a hospital directly from the finishing area.

Honda biker Juan Barreda Bort ran out of fuel at kilometre 267 on Stage 11, after missing the refueling point at kilometre 174. Bort was leading the race at a waypoint at kilometre 215. After failing to get help from other competitors for two hours, he called in for medical assistance and was airlifted to the hospital. Juan suffered a fall two days ago, where he fell unconscious for a short time, but was able to continue.

References 

Dakar Rally
Saudi Arabia sport-related lists
Dakar
Dakar
Dakar Rally
Dakar Rally